Torre dels Escipions is a funerary tower built by the Romans on the outskirts of Tarraco, ancient Roman city that corresponds to the present city of Tarragona (Catalonia, Spain). The Torre dels Escipions is one of the elements of the Archaeological Ensemble of Tarraco, declared a World Heritage Site by UNESCO, the tower being identified with the code 875-010.

History 

It was built during the 1st century AD, six kilometers from the city of Tarraco, capital of the Hispania Citerior, in the course of the Via Augusta, the Roman road that crossed the entire peninsula from the Pyrenees to Gades (Cadiz) and is one of the most important funerary monuments of the Roman era that still remains in the Iberian Peninsula.

Architectural features 

Is a Turriform  monument with three floors superimposed on a declining basis. It is built with rectangular blocks. In the intermediate body are two reliefs of the god of Phrygian Attis deity of  death and resurrection, son of Pessinunte and also on the same level there is a burial chamber that housed the furnishings of the deceased; at the base measures 4.40 x 4.70 m..

Trivia 

Its name comes from a misidentification of the two reliefs of the god Attis, who for years were identified as those of Scipio brothers (Publius and Gnaeus).

See also
Tarraco
List of Roman sites in Spain

Tarragona
Ancient Roman buildings and structures in Catalonia
World Heritage Sites in Catalonia
Buildings and structures completed in the 1st century